Sean McGlinchy (born 29 April 1992 in Derry) is an amateur boxer from Northern Ireland. He competed in the men's light-heavyweight division at the 2014 Commonwealth Games where he won a bronze medal.

References 

1992 births
Living people
Male boxers from Northern Ireland
Light-heavyweight boxers
Commonwealth Games bronze medallists for Northern Ireland
Boxers at the 2014 Commonwealth Games
Sportspeople from Derry (city)
Irish male boxers
Commonwealth Games medallists in boxing
Medallists at the 2014 Commonwealth Games